Panionios B.C. in international competitions is the history and statistics of Panionios B.C. in FIBA Europe and Euroleague Basketball Company competitions.

1970s

1975–76 FIBA Korać Cup, 3rd–tier
The 1975–76 FIBA Korać Cup was the 5th installment of the European 3rd-tier level professional basketball club competition FIBA Korać Cup, running from October 28, 1975 to March 23, 1976. The trophy was won by Jugoplastika, who defeated Chinamartini Torino by a result of 179–166 in a two-legged final on a home and away basis. Overall, Panionios achieved in present competition a record of 1 win against 1 defeat, in only one round. More detailed:

First round
 Tie played on October 28, 1975 and on November 4, 1975.

|}

1976–77 FIBA Korać Cup, 3rd–tier
The 1976–77 FIBA Korać Cup was the 6th installment of the European 3rd-tier level professional basketball club competition FIBA Korać Cup, running from October 19, 1976 to April 5, 1977. The trophy was won by Jugoplastika, who defeated Alco Bologna by a result of 87–84 at Palasport della Fiera in Genoa, Italy. Overall, Panionios achieved in present competition a record of 0 wins against 2 defeats, in two successive rounds. More detailed:

First round
 Bye

Second round
 Tie played on November 16, 1976 and on November 23, 1976.

|}

1977–78 FIBA Korać Cup, 3rd–tier
The 1977–78 FIBA Korać Cup was the 7th installment of the European 3rd-tier level professional basketball club competition FIBA Korać Cup, running from November 15, 1977 to March 21, 1978. The trophy was won by Partizan, who defeated Bosna by a result of 117–110 (OT) at Sportska dvorana Borik in Banja Luka, Yugoslavia. Overall, Panionios achieved in present competition a record of 1 win against 1 defeat, in only one round. More detailed:

First round
 Tie played on November 15, 1977 and on November 22, 1977.

|}

1978–79 FIBA Korać Cup, 3rd–tier
The 1978–79 FIBA Korać Cup was the 8th installment of the European 3rd-tier level professional basketball club competition FIBA Korać Cup, running from October 31, 1978 to March 20, 1979. The trophy was won by Partizan, who defeated Arrigoni Rieti by a result of 108–98 at Hala Pionir in Belgrade, Yugoslavia. Overall, Panionios achieved in present competition a record of 1 win against 1 defeat, in only one round. More detailed:

First round
 Tie played on October 31, 1978 and on November 7, 1978.

|}

1980s

1984–85 FIBA Korać Cup, 3rd–tier
The 1984–85 FIBA Korać Cup was the 14th installment of the European 3rd-tier level professional basketball club competition FIBA Korać Cup, running from October 3, 1984 to March 21, 1985. The trophy was won by Simac Milano, who defeated Ciaocrem Varese by a result of 91–78 at Palais du Midi in Brussels, Belgium. Overall, Panionios achieved in present competition a record of 2 wins against 2 defeats, in two successive rounds. More detailed:

First round
 Tie played on October 3, 1984 and on October 10, 1984.

|}

Second round
 Tie played on October 31, 1984 and on November 7, 1984.

|}

1985–86 FIBA Korać Cup, 3rd–tier
The 1985–86 FIBA Korać Cup was the 15th installment of the European 3rd-tier level professional basketball club competition FIBA Korać Cup, running from October 2, 1985 to March 27, 1986. The trophy was won by Banco di Roma Virtus, who defeated Mobilgirgi Caserta by a result of 157–150 in a two-legged final on a home and away basis. Overall, Panionios achieved in present competition a record of 2 wins against 2 defeats, in two successive rounds. More detailed:

First round
 Tie played on October 2, 1985 and on October 9, 1985.

|}

Second round
 Tie played on October 30, 1985 and on November 6, 1985.

|}

1986–87 FIBA Korać Cup, 3rd–tier
The 1986–87 FIBA Korać Cup was the 16th installment of the European 3rd-tier level professional basketball club competition FIBA Korać Cup, running from October 1, 1986 to March 25, 1987. The trophy was won by FC Barcelona, who defeated Limoges CSP by a result of 203–171 in a two-legged final on a home and away basis. Overall, Panionios achieved in present competition a record of 2 wins against 2 defeats, in two successive rounds. More detailed:

First round
 Tie played on October 1, 1986 and on October 8, 1986.

|}

Second round
 Tie played on October 29, 1986 and on November 5, 1986.

|}

1987–88 FIBA Korać Cup, 3rd–tier
The 1987–88 FIBA Korać Cup was the 17th installment of the European 3rd-tier level professional basketball club competition FIBA Korać Cup, running from September 23, 1987 to March 9, 1988. The trophy was won by Real Madrid, who defeated Cibona by a result of 195–183 in a two-legged final on a home and away basis. Overall, Panionios achieved in present competition a record of 1 win against 1 defeat, in only one round. More detailed:

First round
 Tie played on September 23, 1987 and on September 30, 1987.

|}

1988–89 FIBA Korać Cup, 3rd–tier
The 1988–89 FIBA Korać Cup was the 18th installment of the European 3rd-tier level professional basketball club competition FIBA Korać Cup, running from October 12, 1988 to March 22, 1989. The trophy was won by Partizan, who defeated Wiwa Vismara Cantù by a result of 177–171 in a two-legged final on a home and away basis. Overall, Panionios achieved in present competition a record of 1 win against 1 defeat, in only one round. More detailed:

First round
 Tie played on October 12, 1988 and on October 19, 1988.

|}

1990s

1989–90 FIBA Korać Cup, 3rd–tier
The 1989–90 FIBA Korać Cup was the 19th installment of the European 3rd-tier level professional basketball club competition FIBA Korać Cup, running from September 27, 1989 to March 28, 1990. The trophy was won by Ram Joventut, who defeated Scavolini Pesaro by a result of 195–184 in a two-legged final on a home and away basis. Overall, Panionios achieved in present competition a record of 8 wins against 4 defeats, in four successive rounds. More detailed:

First round
 Tie played on September 27, 1989 and on October 4, 1989.

|}

Second round
 Tie played on October 25, 1989 and on November 1, 1989.

|}

Top 16
 Day 1 (December 6, 1989)

|}

 Day 2 (December 13, 1989)

|}

 Day 3 (January 17, 1990)

|}

 Day 4 (January 24, 1990)

|}

 Day 5 (January 31, 1990)

|}

 Day 6 (February 7, 1990)

|}

 Group B standings:

Quarterfinals
 Tie played on February 21, 1990 and on February 28, 1990.

|}

1990–91 FIBA Korać Cup, 3rd–tier
The 1990–91 FIBA Korać Cup was the 20th installment of the European 3rd-tier level professional basketball club competition FIBA Korać Cup, running from September 26, 1990 to March 27, 1991. The trophy was won by Shampoo Clear Cantù, who defeated Real Madrid Otaysa by a result of 168–164 in a two-legged final on a home and away basis. Overall, Panionios achieved in present competition a record of 6 wins against 4 defeats, in three successive rounds. More detailed:

First round
 Tie played on September 26, 1990 and on October 3, 1990.

|}

Second round
 Tie played on October 24, 1990 and on October 31, 1990.

|}

Top 16
 Day 1 (December 12, 1990)

|}

 Day 2 (December 19, 1990)

|}

 Day 3 (January 2, 1991)

|}

 Day 4 (January 9, 1991)

|}

 Day 5 (January 16, 1991)

|}

 Day 6 (January 23, 1991)

|}

 Group D standings:

1991–92 FIBA European Cup, 2nd–tier
The 1991–92 FIBA European Cup was the 26th installment of FIBA's 2nd-tier level European-wide professional club basketball competition FIBA European Cup (lately called FIBA Saporta Cup), running from September 10, 1991 to March 17, 1992. The trophy was won by Real Madrid Asegurator, who defeated the title holder PAOK by a result of 65–63 at Palais des Sports de Beaulieu in Nantes, France. Overall, Panionios achieved in the present competition a record of 8 wins against 8 defeats, in four successive rounds. More detailed:

First round
 Tie played on September 8, 1991 and on September 10, 1991.

|}

Second round
 Tie played on October 1, 1991 and on October 8, 1991.

|}

Third round
 Tie played on October 29, 1991 and on November 5, 1991.

|}

Top 12
 Day 1 (November 26, 1991)

|}

 Day 2 (December 3, 1991)

|}

 Day 3 (December 10, 1991)

|}

 Day 4 (December 17, 1991)

|}

 Day 5 (January 7, 1992)

|}

 Day 6 (January 15, 1992)

|}

 Day 7 (January 21, 1992)

|}

 Day 8 (January 28, 1992)

|}

 Day 9 (February 4, 1992)

|}

 Day 10 (February 11, 1992)

|}

 Group B standings:

1992–93 FIBA Korać Cup, 3rd–tier
The 1992–93 FIBA Korać Cup was the 22nd installment of the European 3rd-tier level professional basketball club competition FIBA Korać Cup, running from September 9, 1992 to March 18, 1993. The trophy was won by Philips Milano, who defeated Virtus Roma by a result of 201–181 in a two-legged final on a home and away basis. Overall, Chipita Panionios achieved in present competition a record of 7 wins against 5 defeats, in five successive rounds. More detailed:

First round
 Bye

Second round
 Tie played on September 30, 1992 and on October 7, 1992.

|}

Third round
 Tie played on October 28, 1992 and on November 4, 1992.

|}

Top 16
 Day 1 (November 25, 1992)

|}

 Day 2 (December 2, 1992)

|}

 Day 3 (December 8, 1992)

|}

 Day 4 (December 16, 1992)

|}

 Day 5 (January 6, 1993)

|}

 Day 6 (January 13, 1993)

|}

 Group C standings:

Quarterfinals
 Tie played on January 27, 1993 and on February 3, 1993.

|}

1993–94 FIBA Korać Cup, 3rd–tier
The 1993–94 FIBA Korać Cup was the 23rd installment of the European 3rd-tier level professional basketball club competition FIBA Korać Cup, running from September 8, 1993 to March 16, 1994. The trophy was won by PAOK Bravo, who defeated Stefanel Trieste by a result of 175–157 in a two-legged final on a home and away basis. Overall, Chipita Panionios achieved in present competition a record of 10 wins against 4 defeats, in six successive rounds. More detailed:

First round
 Bye

Second round
 Tie played on September 29, 1993 and on October 6, 1993.

|}

Third round
 Tie played on October 27, 1993 and on November 2, 1993.

|}

Top 16
 Day 1 (November 24, 1993)

|}

 Day 2 (November 30, 1993)

|}

 Day 3 (December 7, 1993)

|}

 Day 4 (December 15, 1993)

|}

 Day 5 (January 6, 1994)

|}

 Day 6 (January 12, 1994)

|}

 Group A standings:

Quarterfinals
 Tie played on January 26, 1994 and on February 2, 1994.

|}

Semifinals
 Tie played on February 16, 1994 and on February 23, 1994.

|}

1994–95 FIBA Korać Cup, 3rd–tier
The 1994–95 FIBA Korać Cup was the 24th installment of the European 3rd-tier level professional basketball club competition FIBA Korać Cup, running from September 7, 1994 to March 15, 1995. The trophy was won by Alba Berlin, who defeated Stefanel Milano by a result of 172–166 in a two-legged final on a home and away basis. Overall, Chipita Panionios achieved in present competition a record of 9 wins against 3 defeats, in five successive rounds. More detailed:

First round
 Bye

Second round
 Tie played on September 28, 1994 and on October 4, 1994.

|}

Third round
 Tie played on October 26, 1994 and on November 1, 1994.

|}

Top 16
 Day 1 (November 23, 1994)

|}

 Day 2 (November 30, 1994)

|}

 Day 3 (December 6, 1994)

|}

 Day 4 (December 13, 1994)

|}

 Day 5 (January 3, 1995)

|}

 Day 6 (January 11, 1995)

|}

 Group C standings:

Quarterfinals
 Tie played on January 25, 1995 and on February 1, 1995.

|}

1995–96 FIBA Korać Cup, 3rd–tier
The 1995–96 FIBA Korać Cup was the 25th installment of the European 3rd-tier level professional basketball club competition FIBA Korać Cup, running from September 6, 1995 to March 13, 1996. The trophy was won by Efes Pilsen, who defeated Stefanel Milano by a result of 146–145 in a two-legged final on a home and away basis. Overall, Panionios Afisorama achieved in present competition a record of 7 wins against 3 defeats, in four successive rounds. More detailed:

First round
 Bye

Second round
 Tie played on September 27, 1995 and on October 4, 1995.

|}

Third round
 Tie played on October 25, 1995 and on October 31, 1995.

|}

Top 16
 Day 1 (November 22, 1995)

|}

 Day 2 (November 29, 1995)

|}

 Day 3 (December 6, 1995)

|}

 Day 4 (December 13, 1995)

|}

 Day 5 (December 19, 1995)

|}

 Day 6 (January 3, 1996)

|}

 Group B standings:

1996–97 FIBA EuroLeague, 1st–tier
The 1996–97 FIBA EuroLeague was the 40th installment of the European top-tier level professional club competition for basketball clubs (now called simply EuroLeague), running from September 19, 1996 to April 24, 1997. The trophy was won by Olympiacos, who defeated FC Barcelona Banca Catalana by a result of 73–58 at PalaEUR in Rome, Italy. Overall, Panionios Ethniki Asfalistiki achieved in present competition a record of 4 wins against 12 defeats, in two successive rounds. More detailed:

First round
 Day 1 (September 19, 1996)

|}

 Day 2 (September 26, 1996)

|}

 Day 3 (October 2, 1996)

|}

 Day 4 (October 10, 1996)

|}

 Day 5 (October 17, 1996)

|}

 Day 6 (November 7, 1996)

|}

 Day 7 (November 14, 1996)

|}

 Day 8 (November 21, 1996)

|}

 Day 9 (December 5, 1996)

|}

 Day 10 (December 12, 1996)

|}

 Group A standings:

Second round
 Day 1 (January 9, 1997)

|}

 Day 2 (January 16, 1997)

|}

 Day 3 (January 23, 1997)

|}

 Day 4 (February 5, 1997)

|}

 Day 5 (February 13, 1997)

|}

 Day 6 (February 20, 1997)

|}

 Group F standings:

1998–99 FIBA Korać Cup, 3rd–tier
The 1998–99 FIBA Korać Cup was the 28th installment of the European 3rd-tier level professional basketball club competition FIBA Korać Cup, running from September 16, 1998 to March 31, 1999. The trophy was won by FC Barcelona, who defeated Adecco Estudiantes by a result of 174–163 in a two-legged final on a home and away basis. Overall, Panionios Nutella achieved in present competition a record of 9 wins against 5 defeats, in six successive rounds. More detailed:

First round
 Bye

Second round
 Day 1 (October 7, 1998)

|}

 Day 2 (October 14, 1998)

|}

 Day 3 (October 21, 1998)

|}

 Day 4 (November 4, 1998)

|}
*Overtime at the end of regulation (60–60).

 Day 5 (November 11, 1998)

|}

 Day 6 (November 18, 1998)

|}

 Group D standings:

Third round
 Tie played on December 9, 1998 and on December 16, 1998.

|}

Top 16
 Tie played on January 13, 1999 and on January 20, 1999.

|}

Quarterfinals
 Tie played on February 10, 1999 and on February 17, 1999.

|}

Semifinals
 Tie played on March 3, 1999 and on March 11, 1999.

|}

2000s

2001–02 FIBA Saporta Cup, 2nd–tier
The 2001–02 FIBA Saporta Cup was the 36th installment of FIBA's 2nd-tier level European-wide professional club basketball competition FIBA Saporta Cup, running from October 30, 2001 to April 30, 2002. The trophy was won by Montepaschi Siena, who defeated Pamesa Valencia by a result of 81–71 at Palais des Sports de Gerland in Lyon, France. Overall, Panionios achieved in the present competition a record of 8 wins against 6 defeats, in three successive rounds. More detailed:

Regular season
 Day 1 (October 30, 2001)

|}

 Day 2 (November 7, 2001)

|}

 Day 3 (November 13, 2001)

|}

 Day 4 (December 5, 2001)

|}

 Day 5 (December 11, 2001)

|}

 Day 6 (December 18, 2001)

|}

 Day 7 (January 9, 2002)

|}

 Day 8 (January 15, 2002)

|}

 Day 9 (January 29, 2002)

|}

 Day 10 (February 5, 2002)

|}

 Group B standings:

*Le Mans Sarthe was docked one point for not playing the game at Hapoel Jerusalem.

Top 16
 Tie played on February 26, 2002 and on March 5, 2002.

|}

Quarterfinals
 Tie played on March 20, 2002 and on March 27, 2002.

|}

2002–03 FIBA Europe Champions Cup, 4th–tier
The 2002–03 FIBA Europe Champions Cup was the 1st installment of FIBA's 4th-tier level European-wide professional club basketball competition FIBA Europe Champions Cup (lately called FIBA EuroCup Challenge), running from October 1, 2002 to May 4, 2003. The trophy was won by Aris, who defeated Prokom Trefl Sopot by a result of 84–83 at Alexandreio Melathron in Thessaloniki, Greece. Overall, Panionios Freddoccino achieved in the present competition a record of 6 wins against 4 defeats, in only one round. More detailed:

Regular season
 Day 1 (October 1, 2002)

|}

 Day 2 (October 9, 2002)

|}

 Day 3 (October 15, 2002)

|}

 Day 4 (October 22, 2002)

|}

 Day 5 (October 29, 2002)

|}

 Day 6 (November 5, 2002)

|}

 Day 7 (November 12, 2002)

|}

 Day 8 (December 3, 2002)

|}

 Day 9 (December 11, 2002)

|}

 Day 10 (December 17, 2002)

|}

 Conference South Group B standings:

2005–06 ULEB Cup, 2nd–tier
The 2005–06 ULEB Cup was the 4th installment of ULEB's 2nd-tier level European-wide professional club basketball competition ULEB Cup (lately called EuroCup Basketball), running from November 8, 2005 to April 11, 2006. The trophy was won by Dynamo Moscow, who defeated Aris TT Bank by a result of 73–60 at Spiroudome in Charleroi, Belgium. Overall, Panionios Forthnet achieved in the present competition a record of 5 wins against 7 defeats, in two successive rounds. More detailed:

Regular season
 Day 1 (November 8, 2005)

|}

 Day 2 (November 15, 2005)

|}

 Day 3 (November 22, 2005)

|}

 Day 4 (November 29, 2005)

|}

 Day 5 (December 6, 2005)

|}

 Day 6 (December 13, 2005)

|}

 Day 7 (December 20, 2005)

|}

 Day 8 (January 3, 2006)

|}

 Day 9 (January 10, 2006)

|}

 Day 10 (January 17, 2006)

|}

 Group B standings:

Top 16
 Tie played on January 31, 2006 and on February 7, 2006.

|}
*The score in the second leg at the end of regulation was 81–79 for Panionios Forthnet, so it was necessary to play two extra-times to decide the winner of this match (94–92 and finally 105–112 for Aris TT Bank).

2006–07 FIBA EuroCup, 3rd–tier
The 2006–07 FIBA EuroCup was the 4th installment of FIBA's 3rd-tier level European-wide professional club basketball competition FIBA EuroCup (lately called FIBA EuroChallenge), running from November 7, 2006 to April 15, 2007. The trophy was won by Akasvayu Girona, who defeated Azovmash Mariupol by a result of 79–72 at Pavelló Municipal Girona-Fontajau in Girona, Spain. Overall, Panionios Forthnet achieved in the present competition a record of 9 wins against 6 defeats, in three successive rounds. More detailed:

Regular season
 Day 1 (November 7, 2006)

|}

 Day 2 (November 14, 2006)

|}

 Day 3 (November 22, 2006)

|}
*Overtime at the end of regulation (73–73).

 Day 4 (November 28, 2006)

|}

 Day 5 (December 5, 2006)

|}

 Day 6 (December 12, 2006)

|}

 Group G standings:

Top 16
 Day 1 (January 9, 2007)

|}

 Day 2 (January 16, 2007)

|}

 Day 3 (January 23, 2007)

|}

 Day 4 (January 30, 2007)

|}

 Day 5 (February 13, 2007)

|}

 Day 6 (February 20, 2007)

|}

 Group K standings:

Quarterfinals
 Best-of-3 playoff: Game 1 away on March 6, 2007 / Game 2 at home on March 8, 2007 / Game 3 away on March 14, 2007.

|}

2007–08 ULEB Cup, 2nd–tier
The 2007–08 ULEB Cup was the 6th installment of ULEB's 2nd-tier level European-wide professional club basketball competition ULEB Cup (lately called EuroCup Basketball), running from November 6, 2007 to April 13, 2008. The trophy was won by DKV Joventut, who defeated Akasvayu Girona by a result of 79–54 at Palavela in Turin, Italy. Overall, Panionios On Telecoms achieved in the present competition a record of 6 wins against 6 defeats, in two successive rounds. More detailed:

Regular season
 Day 1 (November 6, 2007)

|}

 Day 2 (November 13, 2007)

|}

 Day 3 (November 20, 2007)

|}
*Overtime at the end of regulation (81–81).

 Day 4 (November 27, 2007)

|}

 Day 5 (December 5, 2007)

|}

 Day 6 (December 11, 2007)

|}

 Day 7 (December 18, 2007)

|}

 Day 8 (January 8, 2008)

|}

 Day 9 (January 15, 2008)

|}

 Day 10 (January 22, 2008)

|}

 Group G standings:

*On 17/01/2008, Gran Canaria Grupo Dunas signed a new contract for the rest of the season and three years more with a new sponsor (Grupo Kalise Menorquina) and adopted the commercial name Kalise Gran Canaria.

Top 32
 Tie played on February 19, 2008 and on February 27, 2008.

|}

2008–09 Euroleague, 1st–tier
The 2008–09 Euroleague was the 9th season of the EuroLeague, under the Euroleague Basketball Company's authority, and it was the 52nd installment of the European top-tier level professional club competition for basketball clubs, running from October 23, 2008 to May 3, 2009. The trophy was won by Panathinaikos, who defeated the title holder CSKA Moscow by a result of 73–71 at O2 World in Berlin, Germany. Overall, Panionios On Telecoms achieved in present competition a record of 3 wins against 7 defeats, in only one round. More detailed:

Regular season
 Day 1 (October 23, 2008)

|}

 Day 2 (October 29, 2008)

|}

 Day 3 (November 5, 2008)

|}

 Day 4 (November 13, 2008)

|}

 Day 5 (November 27, 2008)

|}

 Day 6 (December 3, 2008)

|}

 Day 7 (December 10, 2008)

|}

 Day 8 (December 18, 2008)

|}

 Day 9 (January 7, 2009)

|}

 Day 10 (January 14, 2009)

|}

 Group D standings:

2010s

2012–13 Eurocup Basketball, 2nd–tier
The 2012–13 Eurocup Basketball was the 11th installment of ULEB's 2nd-tier level European-wide professional club basketball competition EuroCup Basketball, running from November 7, 2012 to April 13, 2013. The trophy was won by Lokomotiv Kuban, who defeated Uxúe Bilbao Basket by a result of 75–64 at Spiroudome in Charleroi, Belgium. Overall, Panionios achieved in the present competition a record of 2 wins against 4 defeats, in only one round. More detailed:

Regular season
 Day 1 (November 7, 2012)

|}

 Day 2 (November 14, 2012)

|}

 Day 3 (November 21, 2012)

|}

 Day 4 (November 28, 2012)

|}

 Day 5 (December 5, 2012)

|}
*Overtime at the end of regulation (89–89).

 Day 6 (December 12, 2012)

|}

 Group F standings:

2013–14 Eurocup Basketball, 2nd–tier
The 2013–14 Eurocup Basketball was the 12th installment of ULEB's 2nd-tier level European-wide professional club basketball competition EuroCup Basketball, running from October 15, 2013 to May 7, 2014. The trophy was won by Valencia Basket, who defeated UNICS by a result of 165–140 in a two-legged final on a home and away basis. Overall, Panionios achieved in the present competition a record of 6 wins against 10 defeats, in two successive rounds. More detailed:

Regular season
 Day 1 (October 16, 2013)

|}

 Day 2 (October 23, 2013)

|}

 Day 3 (October 30, 2013)

|}

 Day 4 (November 6, 2013)

|}

 Day 5 (November 13, 2013)

|}

 Day 6 (November 20, 2013)

|}

 Day 7 (November 27, 2013)

|}

 Day 8 (December 4, 2013)

|}

 Day 9 (December 11, 2013)

|}

 Day 10 (December 18, 2013)

|}
*Overtime at the end of regulation (80–80).

 Eastern Conference Group H standings:

Top 32
 Day 1 (January 8, 2014)

|}

 Day 2 (January 14, 2014)

|}

 Day 3 (January 22, 2014)

|}

 Day 4 (January 29, 2014)

|}

 Day 5 (February 12, 2014)

|}

 Day 6 (February 19, 2014)

|}

 Group L standings:

Record
Panionios B.C. has overall, from the 1975–76 season (first participation) to the 2013–14 season (last participation): 123 wins against 112 defeats, in 235 games, during play in all the European club competitions.
 (1st–tier) FIBA EuroLeague & EuroLeague: 7–19 in 26 games.
 (2nd–tier) FIBA European Cup & FIBA Saporta Cup: 16–14 in 30 games.
 (2nd–tier) EuroCup: 19–27 in 46 games.
 (3rd–tier) FIBA Korać Cup: 66–42 108 games.
 (3rd–tier) FIBA EuroCup: 9–6 in 15 games.
 (4th–tier) FIBA Europe Champions Cup: 6–4 in 10 games.

See also
 Greek basketball clubs in international competitions

References

External links
FIBA Europe
EuroLeague
ULEB
EuroCup

Europe
Greek basketball clubs in European and worldwide competitions